Blank Check with Griffin & David is a film podcast following the career output of directors who have had significant success and are then offered a figurative blank check to pursue their passion projects. Most episodes focus on a single movie from the director's filmography, and the show is grouped into "miniseries," in which some or all of the director's films are reviewed. The show is hosted by The Atlantic film critic David Sims and actor Griffin Newman. As of February 2023, the podcast is discussing the films of Danny Boyle.

Series overview

The Blank Check website describes the podcast as:Not just another bad movie podcast, Blank Check reviews directors' complete filmographies episode to episode. Specifically, the auteurs whose early successes afforded them the rare ‘blank check’ from Hollywood to produce passion projects. Each new miniseries, hosts Griffin Newman and David Sims delve into the works of film’s most outsized personalities in painstakingly hilarious detail.

Origins: Griffin and David Present
The podcast was originally entitled Griffin and David Present, and assessed the Star Wars prequel films as if in a universe where the other Star Wars films did not exist. Originally planning to spend 50 episodes on each film, producer Ben Hosley convinced the hosts to only do ten. Having used a lengthy analysis of a filmography as a means of discussing the films' director, Newman and Sims decided to use a similar approach in reviewing the works of other directors, and retitled the show Blank Check with Griffin and David.

Blank Check with Griffin & David
Each miniseries is given a loosely comedic title which combines the word "podcast" with either a title of a film or the director's name. If a director they've previously discussed releases a new film, they will work it into their schedule of upcoming shows.

Notable Guests

Blank Check: Special Features 
On January 1, 2019, Newman and Sims created a Patreon page, Blank Check: Special Features, where fans could pay a monthly amount in exchange for extra content. Blank Check Special Features focuses primarily on audio commentary about films that are part of franchises, including the Marvel Cinematic Universe, Toy Story, Mission: Impossible, The Santa Clause, and Alien. The Patreon feed also offers monthly bonus episodes and other content related to the current miniseries or general interest.

, the Blank Check Patreon was ranked 44th in the podcast category based on the number of paying supporters, with an estimated 12,693 subscribers.

Reception 
Blank Check has been positively reviewed by Paste Magazine, Decider, and The A.V. Club. The show was included in Esquire's list of the best 21 podcasts of 2018, as well as on Paste Magazine's list of the top 30 podcasts of the decade. It has also been featured in Vulture and Entertainment Weekly as a selection of the week.

Notes

References

External links 
 

2015 podcast debuts
American podcasts
Audio podcasts
Comedy and humor podcasts
Film and television podcasts
Patreon creators